The 2022 Football Northern Territory season in Northern Territory. The men's competitions consisted of three major divisions across the State.

League table

2022 NorZone Premier League
The season began on 8 April, concluding with the Grand Final on 1 October.

Finals series

2022 NorZone Division One
The season began on 8 April, concluding with the Grand Final on 1 October.

Finals series

2022 Southern Zone Premier League
The season began on 2 April, concluding with the Grand Final on 17 September.

Finals series

References

2022 in Australian soccer
Soccer in the Northern Territory